Slava Zupančič (5 July 1931 – 2 April 2000) was a Slovenian alpine skier. She competed in three events at the 1956 Winter Olympics, representing Yugoslavia.

References

1931 births
2000 deaths
Slovenian female alpine skiers
Olympic alpine skiers of Yugoslavia
Alpine skiers at the 1956 Winter Olympics
Sportspeople from Kranj